Neckar-Alb is one of three regions (Regionalverband) in the Tübingen administrative region (Regierungsbezirke) in Baden-Württemberg, Germany.  It contains the Neckar river.

Neckar-Alb is the third largest industrial zone in Germany.

It is divided into:
Reutlingen district
Tübingen district
Zollernalb district

External links
www.neckaralb.de — official website
www.regionalverband-neckar-alb.de — in German

Planning regions in Baden-Württemberg